

See also
 Immune sera and immunoglobulins for human use are in the ATC group J06.
 Vaccines for human use are in the ATC group J07.

References

I